Busted Stuff is the fifth studio album by Dave Matthews Band, released on July 16, 2002 by RCA Records. Produced by Stephen Harris, it was the band's second album not to feature longtime producer Steve Lillywhite.

Nine of the album's eleven tracks are re-recorded versions of songs that first appeared on an album the band had abandoned in 2000, a project that had come to be known as The Lillywhite Sessions; "Where Are You Going"—the first single from Busted Stuff—and "You Never Know" were not from The Lillywhite Sessions.

Recording
Work on the album began in January 2002 at Record Plant Studios in Sausalito, California. The band had been road testing much of the material from the abandoned Steve Lillywhite sessions and felt that these songs deserved a spot on their followup to Everyday. Matthews reworked many of the lyrics while the rest of the band continued to evolve the arrangements. Through the recording process, two new songs were created: "Where Are You Going" and "You Never Know".

Busted Stuff is the first album the band recorded without any special guests.

Commercial performance
Busted Stuff debut at No. 1 on the U.S. Billboard 200, selling 621,700 copies in its first week. The album also debuted at No. 1 on the Canadian Albums Chart, selling 21,700 copies in the country in its first week.

Track listing

Deleted tracks
These songs were recorded during the Busted Stuff sessions but weren't included on the final cut of the album:
 "JTR" – previously recorded during the Lillywhite sessions
 "Sweet Up and Down" – previously recorded during the Lillywhite sessions
 "Monkey Man" – previously recorded during the Lillywhite sessions
 "Counting the Stars" – an early version of a song that merged with another piece of music to become "You Never Know"

Bonus DVD
Busted Stuff came with a bonus DVD, titled Some Other Stuff, featuring two live performances from Boulder, Colorado from July 11, 2001—"When the World Ends" and "Bartender"—as well as 5.1 audio of the studio version of "Bartender."

Personnel
Dave Matthews Band
Carter Beauford – drums
Stefan Lessard – bass guitar, dobro, piano, Hammond organ
Dave Matthews – acoustic and electric guitars, lead vocals
LeRoi Moore – saxophone, penny whistle, flute
Boyd Tinsley – electric violin

Production personnel
 Stephen Harris – producer
 John Alagía – mixing
 John Nelson – engineering
 Leff Lefferts, Enrique Müller – second engineers
 Jared Miller – assistant second engineer
 Ted Jensen – mastering
 Jonathan Adler – assistant editor 
 Henry Luniewski – drum technician
 Robert Montgomery – guitar technician
 Erik Porter – bass & violin technician
 David Saull – horn technician

Artwork
 David J. Matthews – art direction, design
 Thane Kerner – art direction, design, digital collage portrait
 Danny Clinch – art direction, design, photography
 Catherine Dee – art direction, design
 Gary Ashley, Hannah Connors – photography assistance

Chart performance
Busted Stuff debuted at No. 1 on the Billboard 200 with 622,000 copies sold in its first week. The album was certified 2x Platinum by the RIAA on August 29, 2002.

Weekly charts

Year-end charts

Certifications

References

Dave Matthews Band albums
2002 albums
RCA Records albums